Lewis Jack Gibson (born 19 July 2000) is an English professional footballer who plays as a centre-back for Bristol Rovers, on loan from Everton.

Club career
Gibson came through the academy of Newcastle United before joining fellow Premier League club Everton in July 2017.

On 31 January 2020, Gibson joined League One side Fleetwood Town on loan until the end of the season. A day later, he made his senior debut as Fleetwood defeated Doncaster Rovers 2–1.

On 22 September 2020 he signed on loan for Reading.

On 7 August 2021, it was announced he had signed a season-long loan at League One side Sheffield Wednesday. He made his debut against Mansfield Town in the EFL Trophy on 5 October 2021, playing the first 45 minutes. After Gibson picked up another injury in his second game against Bolton Wanderers, manager Darren Moore confirmed that Gibson had returned to his parent club and would unlikely return. However, Gibson stayed at Wednesday and returned from injury against Doncaster Rovers on 19 February 2022.

On 12 August 2022, Gibson joined League One club Bristol Rovers on loan for the 2022–23 season. Gibson made his debut off the bench the following day in a 1–0 victory over Oxford United. Having suffered a thigh injury on New Year's Day following a long spell in the first-team, he was ruled out for several weeks. Having missed seven matches, Gibson returned to the first-team selection picture at the end of February.

International career
Gibson has represented England at under-17, under-18 and under-20 level and was part of the side who lifted the FIFA U-17 World Cup in 2017.

Personal life
Gibson's older brother Liam is also a professional footballer and currently plays for Morecambe.

Gibson attended Tanfield School.

Career statistics

Honours
England U17
FIFA U-17 World Cup: 2017
UEFA European Under-17 Championship runner-up: 2017
Everton U23s

 Premier League Cup: 2018–19

References

2000 births
Living people
English footballers
England youth international footballers
Association football defenders
Newcastle United F.C. players
Everton F.C. players
Fleetwood Town F.C. players
Reading F.C. players
Sheffield Wednesday F.C. players
Bristol Rovers F.C. players
English Football League players